The 8-inch Navy gun Mk.VI M3A2 on railway mount M1A1 was a World War II improved replacement for the World War I-era 8-inch (203 mm) M1888 gun and was used by the US Army's Coast Artillery Corps in US harbor defenses. The guns were also mounted in fixed emplacements on the barbette carriage M1A1. These guns were US Navy surplus 8"/45 caliber guns from battleships scrapped under the 1922 Washington Naval Treaty. Mark VI (also Mark 6) was the Navy designation. The Army designation for this gun was "8-inch Navy gun Mk.VI M3A2".

History
The ex-Navy Mark VI railway gun was quickly put together at the start of World War II, to supplement the older World War I 8-inch M1888 railway gun. It was developed from an experimental 12-inch (305 mm) railway howitzer carriage of World War I. The all-around rotating mount and outriggers were designed to allow the gun to track a moving target for coast defense. These guns had a very short life in Army use, entering service in February 1941 and being cut up for scrap immediately after the war. The guns were the Navy's 8-inch (203 mm)/45 caliber Mark VI, and were originally secondary armament on Virginia- and Connecticut-class battleships launched 1904-06 and scrapped in the 1920s. They were mounted in both fixed emplacements and on the M1A1 railway carriage.

Deployment
 Fixed two-gun batteries at Fort Church (Narragansett Bay, Rhode Island), Fort Rosecrans (San Diego, California), Fort Ruger and two other locations (Oahu, Hawaii) (two not completed), Fort Schwatka (Dutch Harbor, Alaska), Fort J. H. Smith and Fort Abercrombie (Kodiak, Alaska), Fort Segarra near St. Thomas in the United States Virgin Islands, and Roosevelt Roads, Puerto Rico (not armed).
 Railway guns: 8 at Fort Miles, Delaware, two 4-gun batteries each in the Los Angeles and Puget Sound harbor defenses and Fort John Custis near Cape Charles, Virginia, others at Fort Hancock, New Jersey (near New York City).

Sighting and fire control equipment
The following sighting equipment was used with the gun.
 M1 Deflection board
 M1 fire adjustment board
 M1A1 Range correction board
 M3 Spotting board
 M1912 Clinometer
 M1 Percentage corrector
 M1A1 Height finder, or M2A1
 M6 Azmuth indicator
 M5 Elevation indicator
 M1910A1 Azmuth instrument
 M8 Helium filling kit
 M1 Gunners quadrant
 Type B, set forward rule
 M1 prediction scale
 bore site
 firing table, 8-I-1.
 M7 stereoscopic trainer
 M1 generating unit

Support cars
 M2 fire control car
 M1 machine shop car
 modified box car for ammunition

Surviving Examples
Four weapons of this type survive:
 One gun at Fort Miles, Delaware, on M1 railway proof mount (experimentally bored out to ) (was previously at Naval Surface Warfare Center Dahlgren Division, Dahlgren, VA
 Two 8-inch Guns Mk VI M3A2 (#160L2 & #154L2), Battery 404, Fort Abercrombie, Kodiak, AK
 One 8-inch Gun Mk VI M3A2 (#134L2), Kodiak Airport, Kodiak, AK (gun formerly at Battery 403, Fort J.H. Smith, Kodiak, AK)

See also

 List of U.S. Army weapons by supply catalog designation
 Railway gun

References

 
 
 SNL E-34

External links
 Navweaps.com 8-inch Mark VI gun photo page
 WWII Army railroad site with info on railway guns
 Breech operation on preserved gun at Fort Miles
 8-inch gun info from Kodiak Military History Museum
 Coast Artillery Journal, Nov-Dec 1942, with article on 8" Mk VI M3A2 guns

World War II artillery of the United States
Coastal artillery
Railway guns
203 mm artillery
Weapons and ammunition introduced in 1941